Eutelsat 31A, formerly e-Bird, Eurobird 3 and Eutelsat 33A, is a communications satellite that offers capacity for broadband and broadcast services in Europe. It is owned by Eutelsat.

Positioned at 31° East - having been relocated from 33° East in May 2014 - Eutelsat 31A is optimised for interactive broadband services, and also valued by broadcasters for occasional use and professional video services, and data networks like Estar by Technologie Satelitarne service.

Its 20 Ku band transponders are connected to four spot beams over Europe and Turkey. These four beams overlap to allow hubs located in the hot spots of each beam to communicate with each other, thus ensuring highly effective pan-European coverage.

References 

Communications satellites in geostationary orbit
Spacecraft launched in 2003
Satellites using the HS-376 bus
Eutelsat satellites
Ariane commercial payloads